Andrei Sîntean (born 16 June 1999) is a Romanian professional footballer who plays as a striker.

References

External links
 
 

1999 births
Living people
Romanian footballers
Romania youth international footballers
Association football forwards
Liga I players
Liga II players
ACS Poli Timișoara players
Sepsi OSK Sfântu Gheorghe players
FC Hermannstadt players
SSU Politehnica Timișoara players
Czech National Football League players
SK Slavia Prague players
FK Viktoria Žižkov players
Olympic footballers of Romania
Footballers at the 2020 Summer Olympics
Romanian expatriate footballers
Romanian expatriate sportspeople in the Czech Republic
Expatriate footballers in the Czech Republic